Christ Church Secondary School (CHR) is a co-educational government-aided secondary school located in Woodlands, Singapore, next to the Singapore Sports School and Woodlands South MRT station. Affiliated with Saint Andrew's Junior College, CHR was first established in 1952 at Dorset Road as a private institution, eventually becoming a government-aided school in 2002.

History
The school began as a private Anglican school in 1952 within the Christ Church Parish at Dorset Road to meet the needs of those students who had missed mainstream education. It was renamed Christ Church Secondary School when it became a government-aided school in 1973. Due to the growing student population, the school moved to its Tyrwhitt Road campus, formerly occupied by Victoria School, in 1985. The school was relocated to a brand new campus in Woodlands in December 2001.

Houses
There are four houses in CHR - GRIT; RUGGED; BOLD; POWER. The houses are most active during inter-house games such as soccer and other sports. Students wear their own house's T-shirt during their Physical Education lessons.

External links
 
 CHR Learning Management System

Secondary schools in Singapore
Woodlands, Singapore
Educational institutions established in 1952
1952 establishments in Malaya